Isfahan railway station (Persian:ايستگاه راه آهن اصفهان, Istgah-e Rah Ahan-e Isfahan) is located in Isfahan, Isfahan Province, the third largest city and second largest metropolitan area of Iran. The station is owned by IRI Railway and currently has two tri-weekly services, one to Mashhad and one to Bandarabbas.

The station is designed as a terminal station, with railways branching off of the main line and ending at the station. This has made some of the lines passing through Isfahan to bypass the station altogether, to save one to two hours of time wasted on going into the branch and reversing out.

There is a metro station under construction at the station connecting the station to the city centre, and Isfahan's two main inter-urban bus terminals.

Service summary
Note: Classifications are unofficial and only to best reflect the type of service offered on each path
Meaning of Classifications:
Local Service: Services originating from a major city, and running outwards, with stops at all stations
Regional Service: Services connecting two major centres, with stops at almost all stations
InterRegio Service: Services connecting two major centres, with stops at major and some minor stations
InterRegio-Express Service:Services connecting two major centres, with stops at major stations
InterCity Service: Services connecting two (or more) major centres, with no stops in between, with the sole purpose of connecting said centres.

References

External links

Railway stations in Iran
Railway stations opened in 1966